Forest of Dean is a local government district in Gloucestershire, England, named after the Forest of Dean. Its council is based in Coleford. Other towns and villages in the district include Blakeney, Cinderford, Drybrook, English Bicknor, Huntley, Littledean, Longhope, Lydbrook, Lydney, Mitcheldean, Newnham and Newent.

The district was formed on 1 April 1974 under the Local Government Act 1972, as a merger of the East Dean Rural District, Lydney Rural District, Newent Rural District and West Dean Rural District, and from Gloucester Rural District the parishes of Newnham and Westbury-on-Severn.

Parishes and settlements

Alvington, Awre, Aylburton	
Blaisdon, Bream, Brockweir, Bromsberrow, Blakeney
Churcham, Cinderford, Coleford	
Drybrook, Dymock	
Ellwood, English Bicknor	
Gorsley and Kilcot
Hartpury, Hewelsfield,  Highleadon, Huntley
Kempley	
Littledean, Little London, Longhope, Lydbrook, Lydney
Mitcheldean
Newent, Newland, Newnham
Oxenhall	
Pauntley, Parkend
Redmarley D'Abitot, Ruardean, Rudford, Ruspidge 	
Soudley, St. Briavels, Staunton (near Coleford), Symonds Yat
Taynton, Tibberton, Tidenham	
Upleadon	
Westbury-on-Severn, West Dean, Woolaston

Responsibilities

Forest of Dean District Council carries out a variety of district council functions including:
Benefits - Housing and Council Tax
Car Parking
Concessionary Travel
Council Tax - Administration and Collection
Elections and Electoral Registration
Environmental Health (includes Domestic and Commercial Premises)
Food Safety and Hygiene Complaints
Noise Pollution and Pest Control
Housing Administration
Licensing
Caravan Sites
Planning, including Planning Applications, Advice and Appeals
Public Conveniences (in some locales)
Health and Leisure Centres
Refuse Collection
Recycling
Tourism and Visitor Information.

See also
 Forest of Dean District Council elections for historic elections, political control and leadership.

References

External links
Forest of Dean District Council
	

 
Non-metropolitan districts of Gloucestershire